A list of British films released in 1939.

1939

See also
 1939 in British music
 1939 in British television
 1939 in the United Kingdom

References

External links
 

1939
Films
British
1930s in British cinema